Jeremy Sams (born 12 January 1957) is a British theatre director, composer, and lyricist.

Early life and education
Sams is the son of the Shakespearean scholar and musicologist Eric Sams.

He read music, French, and German at Magdalene College, Cambridge and piano at Guildhall School of Music. Early on, he worked as a freelance pianist and coach, giving frequent recitals and tours and doing stints as a repetiteur at opera houses in Brussels and Ankara.

Career
Sams directed a revival of Michael Frayn's farce Noises Off, which he mounted in London's Royal National Theatre in 2000. This production then transferred to the West End, and then to Brooks Atkinson Theatre on Broadway in 2001.

Among his other directing credits are the West End musicals Spend Spend Spend (1999), the story of Viv Nicholson, who squandered a fortune won in the British lottery, and a stage adaptation of the film Chitty Chitty Bang Bang (2002) for both of which he received Laurence Olivier Award nominations; the 2002 Broadway production Amour, which he translated from the original French libretto by Didier Van Cauwelaert. His efforts earned him two Tony Award and two Drama Desk Award nominations. His directing credits also include Jason Carr and Gary Yershon's musical of The Water Babies at the Chichester Festival Theatre in 2003. He directed the Jason Robert Brown Broadway musical13 at the Bernard B. Jacobs Theatre, on Broadway. He has also written and directed the stage adaptation of The Good Life based on the BBC TV sitcom which toured the UK in autumn 2021, and will direct a stage adaptation of The Lavender Hill Mob based on the 1951 Ealing comedy film which will begin touring in autumn 2022.

Sams' many translations include plays by Botho Strauß; Mozart's The Marriage of Figaro, The Magic Flute, Puccini's La Boheme, and Wagner's The Ring Cycle for ENO; The Merry Widow for Covent Garden; Les Parents terribles, The Miser and Mary Stuart for the Royal National Theatre; The Threepenny Opera for the Donmar Warehouse; and What's in a Name? for the Birmingham Repertory Theatre.

Sams' composing credits include the BBC film of Jane Austen's Persuasion, for which he won a BAFTA award for Best Music. Other scores include The Mother (2003) and Enduring Love (2004).

Sams has written, arranged, and directed music for some 50 theatre productions, including The Wind in the Willows and Arcadia (RNT) and The Merry Wives of Windsor (RSC).

Personal life

Sams has one child with actress Maria Friedman.

References

Alumni of the Guildhall School of Music and Drama
Alumni of Magdalene College, Cambridge
BAFTA winners (people)
British theatre directors
British dramatists and playwrights
English lyricists
British composers
1957 births
Living people
Ivor Novello Award winners
English male dramatists and playwrights
People educated at Whitgift School
Contestants on University Challenge